The Golden Fleece is a 1918 American silent comedy drama film directed by Gilbert P. Hamilton and starring Joseph Bennett, Peggy Pearce and Jack Curtis.

Cast
 Joseph Bennett as Jason 
 Peggy Pearce as Rose
 Jack Curtis as Bainge
 Harvey Clark as 	Regelman
 Graham Pettie as 	Hiram

References

Bibliography
 Connelly, Robert B. The Silents: Silent Feature Films, 1910-36, Volume 40, Issue 2. December Press, 1998.
 Munden, Kenneth White. The American Film Institute Catalog of Motion Pictures Produced in the United States, Part 1. University of California Press, 1997.

External links
 

1918 films
1918 comedy films
1910s English-language films
American silent feature films
Silent American comedy films
Films directed by Gilbert P. Hamilton
American black-and-white films
Triangle Film Corporation films
1910s American films